John Lees may refer to:

Sir John Lees, 1st Baronet (1737–1811), Secretary of Irish Post Office and Black Rod in Ireland
John Lees (artist) (born 1943), American contemporary artist
John Lees (bodybuilder) (born 1930), English bodybuilder
John Lees (inventor), English textile machinery inventor
John Lees (politician) (c. 1740–1807), Canadian politician
John Frederick Lees (1809–1867), British member of parliament for Oldham
John Lees (footballer), English footballer for Derby County
John Lees (gymnast) (born 1931), Australian Olympic gymnast
John Lees (walker), English record-breaking walker and journalist
John Lees (musician), English musician who founded the rock band Barclay James Harvest

See also
Jack Lees (1884–1940), MP for Derbyshire, England
John Lees-Jones (1887–1966), British politician